Rabbi Yitzhak Mizrachi Sharabi (d.1803 in Jerusalem), also known as Hezekiahu Isaac Mizrahi Sharabi, was the second Rosh Yeshiva of Beit El yeshiva and son of the Rashash. He was also related to Rav Chakham Yehiel Sharabi.

References 

Rabbis in Ottoman Palestine
Yemenite Orthodox rabbis
Year of birth unknown
Rabbis in Jerusalem

1803 deaths